The Death of General Warren at the Battle of Bunker's Hill, June 17, 1775 refers to several oil paintings completed in the late 18th and early 19th century by the American artist John Trumbull depicting the death of Founding Father Joseph Warren at the June 17, 1775, Battle of Bunker Hill, during the American Revolutionary War.  Warren, an influential Massachusetts physician and politician, had been commissioned as a general but served in the battle as a private.  He was killed during or shortly after the storming of the redoubt atop Breed's Hill by a British officer.

The paintings are iconic images of the American Revolution. Trumbull painted several versions, including the one held by the Museum of Fine Arts, Boston (dated between 1815 and 1831). This was commissioned by the Warren family and passed down through the family before being acquired by the museum. Another, larger version (dated 1834) is held by the Wadsworth Atheneum in Hartford, Connecticut.  Trumbull sold the engraving rights for both this painting and The Death of General Montgomery in the Attack on Quebec, December 31, 1775, which resulted in a highly successful subscription release that greatly enhanced his career.

Event
Artist John Trumbull (1756–1843) was in the colonial army camp at Roxbury, Massachusetts on June 17, 1775, the day of the Battle of Bunker Hill.  He watched the battle unfold through field glasses, and later decided to depict one of its central events.  Joseph Warren, a Massachusetts politician and member of the colony's Committee of Safety, volunteered to serve under Colonel William Prescott in the defense of the redoubt which the colonists had constructed on top of Breed's Hill.  This redoubt was the target of three British attacks, of which the first two were repulsed.  The third attack succeeded, in part because the defenders had run out of ammunition.  Warren was struck by a musket or pistol ball during the evacuation of the redoubt, and killed instantly.

Description

The central focus of the painting is Warren's body, dressed in white, and John Small, a British major, dressed in a scarlet uniform (holding a sword in his left hand). Small, who had served with colonial general Israel Putnam during the French and Indian War, is shown preventing a fellow British soldier from bayoneting Warren. Trumbull wanted to express the poignancy in the conflict of men who had earlier served together.

On the far right of the painting is a colonial officer, Thomas Grosvenor, with a black man holding a musket behind him.  The black man was long thought to be Peter Salem, a freed slave who served in the cause of American independence. Later research identified him as a slave belonging to Grosvenor.

The foreground is littered with bodies from both sides of the conflict, and the background includes clusters of colonial and British troops carrying flags. Boston Harbor is also visible in the distance. The sky is partially obscured by smoke rising from Charlestown, which had been torched by the British.

In describing the painting for a catalogue of his works, Trumbull explained why he chose to emphasize the British Major Small's role, saying that Small, whom he had met in London, "was equally distinguished by acts of humanity and kindness to his enemies, as by bravery and fidelity to the cause he served."

People depicted

British soldiers
Major John Small, the redcoated British soldier stepping over a fallen redcoat soldier to hold back the bayonet of a fellow soldier
Major John Pitcairn, falling back dying in his son's (Lieutenant Pitcairn's) arms
General Henry Clinton, bare-headed British officer with raised sword at the rear, center of the painting
 General William Howe, standing to the left of Clinton from the viewer's point of view with his sword pointing forward.
Lord Rawdon, then a lieutenant, holds the British colour, center-right in the painting
Lieutenant Colonel James Abercrombie, the redcoat soldier laying dead underneath John Small and at General Warren's feet.

Colonists
Joseph Warren
Thomas Grosvenor, soldier to the far right
An African-American slave of Grosvenor, shown behind the officer 
Major Andrew McClary
A black freeman, possibly Peter Salem, head visible below the flags on the left side of the painting
General Israel Putnam, colonial officer on the far left of the painting
Thomas Knowlton, standing over Warren and holding a musket
Lieutenant-Colonel Moses Parker of Chelmsford is depicted sitting wounded to the left of Warren 
Colonel Thomas Gardner lying on ground lower right. Both Gardner and Parker were taken prisoner, and both died in early July in Boston.
Colonel William Prescott, who allegedly ordered his soldiers not to fire until "you see the whites of their eyes".

References
Notes

Sources

Masur, Louis P.  "Pictures Have Now Become a Necessity": The Use of Images in American History Textbooks."  The Journal of American History, March 1998, pp. 1409–24.

External links
Blog on the forensics of Warren's death

Paintings about the American Revolution
1786 paintings
Massachusetts in the American Revolution
Paintings by John Trumbull
War paintings
Flags in art
Cultural depictions of American men
Cultural depictions of military officers